Leucospermum muirii is a rounded, upright, evergreen shrub of about  high, with a single trunk at its base, that is assigned to the Proteaceae. It has pale to greenish yellow flowers, becoming orange with age, with some long hairs near their tips, from which straight styles stick out. This gives the flower head the likeness of a pincushion. It flowers from July till October and is pollinated by birds. It is called Albertinia pincushion in English and bloukoolhout in Afrikaans. It is an endemic species that can only be found near Albertinia in the very south of the Western Cape province of South Africa.

Description 

The lowest, fully merged, part of the perianth, called tube, is about ½ cm (0.2 in) long, cylindric in shape or slightly laterally compressed, hairless at base and minutely powdery where it merges into the middle part (or claws) where the perianth is split lengthwise, which is also powdery or have very short hairs.

The subtribe Proteinae, to which the genus Leucospermum has been assigned, consistently has a basic chromosome number of twelve (2n=24).

Differences with related species 
L. muirii looks like L. truncatum, which has more soft hair on its broader leaves.

Taxonomy 
As far as we know, the Albertinia pincushion was first collected for science by the South African naturalist John Muir in 1909, from a location called Zandhoogte near Albertinia. In 1910, Edwin Percy Phillips described it and named it in honor of its collector Leucospermum muirii. It has been assigned to the section Tumiditubus.

Distribution, habitat and ecology 
The Albertinia pincushion only grows in flats consisting of deep, white sands, where it may form small dense stands, in the company of several Ericaceae, tall Restionaceae, Leucadendron galpinii, Leucospermum praecox and Protea repens. It is pollinated by birds. The seeds need about two months to ripen and subsequently fall to the ground, to be collected by ants and carried into their underground nests. The plants die when exposed to one of the wildfires that naturally occurs in the fynbos where this plant grows, but the stored seeds will subsequently germinate to continuate the population.

Conservation 
The Albertinia pincushion is considered endangered as it has a very limited distribution of below  and is under thread by agricultural development, so-called field improvements to increase the yield of tall restionids for thatching, invasive species, urban expansion near Albertinia and climate change. The species can often only be found on roadsides, suggesting it has already disappeared from the surrounding fields.

References

External links 
 several photos

muirii
Endemic flora of South Africa
Plants described in 1910